Lupinoblennius is a genus of combtooth blennies found in the western Atlantic Ocean.

Species
There are currently three recognized species in this genus:
 Lupinoblennius nicholsi (Tavolga, 1954) (Highfin blenny)
 Lupinoblennius paivai (S. Y. Pinto, 1958) (Paiva's blenny)
 Lupinoblennius vinctus (Poey, 1867) (Mangrove blenny)

References

 
Salarinae